Perth Immigration Detention Centre was opened in 1981 and is located near the domestic terminal of Perth Airport, Western Australia.

The Perth IDC contained both a detention centre and residential housing for families. In 2009 it was managed by G4S, a private company, but  it is managed by the Australian Government Department of Immigration and Border Protection.

See also
 Australian immigration detention facilities
 List of Australian immigration detention facilities
 Mandatory detention in Australia

References

1981 establishments in Australia
Immigration detention centres and prisons of Australia